Eady Ice Piedmont is the ice piedmont lying south of Mount Discovery and Minna Bluff, merging at the south side with the Ross Ice Shelf, Antarctica. It was mapped by the United States Geological Survey from ground surveys and Navy air photos, and was named by the Advisory Committee on Antarctic Names in 1963 for Captain Jack A. Eady, U.S. Navy, Chief of Staff to the Commander, U.S. Naval Support Force, Antarctica, from July 1959 to April 1962.

References 

Ice piedmonts of Antarctica
Hillary Coast